Bret Halsey (born June 1, 2000) is an American soccer player who plays as a defender for FC Cincinnati 2 in the MLS Next Pro.

Career

Youth
Halsey played high school soccer at Potomac Falls High School, where he was a Second Team All-Conference selection, as well as playing club soccer at Loudoun Soccer Club. With Loudoun, Halsey helped the under-16 boys team secure the club's first national title.

College and amateur 
In 2018, Halsey attended the University of Virginia to play college soccer. In three seasons with the Cavaliers, Halsey made 31 appearances, scoring one goal and tallying two assists. In his sophomore and junior seasons, he was named to the ACC All-Tournament team.

In 2019, Halsey also played in the NPSL for Northern Virginia United, where he made three appearances.

On January 19, 2021, it was announced Halsey would leave college early and sign a Generation Adidas contract, allowing him to enter the 2021 MLS SuperDraft.

Professional 
On January 21, 2021, Halsey was selected 7th overall in the 2021 MLS SuperDraft by Real Salt Lake.

Halsey made his professional debut on July 9, 2021, starting for Salt Lake's USL Championship side Real Monarchs in a 3–1 loss to El Paso Locomotive.

On August 9, 2022, Halsey signed on loan with Colorado Springs Switchbacks for the remainder of the USL Championship season.

Following the 2022 season, his contract option was declined by Salt Lake. Following his release from Salt Lake, Halsey signed with MLS Next Pro side FC Cincinnati 2.

References

External links 
 
 
 Real Salt Lake Bret Halsey | Real Salt Lake

2000 births
American soccer players
Association football defenders
Living people
Colorado Springs Switchbacks FC players
MLS Next Pro players
National Premier Soccer League players
People from Sterling, Virginia
Real Monarchs players
Real Salt Lake draft picks
Real Salt Lake players
Soccer players from Virginia
USL Championship players
Virginia Cavaliers men's soccer players